Jeon Byung-Guk (sometimes romanised as Jeon Byung-Uk; born August 19, 1987) is a South Korean former footballer that played for Geylang United FC in the S.League. Together with former teammate Kim Jae-Hong he was sentenced to jail in 2012 for attempted match fixing involving his former team.

References

External links

1987 births
Association football midfielders
South Korean expatriate footballers
South Korean expatriate sportspeople in Indonesia
South Korean footballers
Expatriate footballers in Indonesia
Liga 1 (Indonesia) players
Living people
Persebaya Surabaya players
Geylang International FC players
Singapore Premier League players